The Suffield and Thompsonville Bridge was a 5-span iron through truss bridge over the Connecticut River located between present day Suffield, Connecticut, and Thompsonville, Connecticut (Enfield).  It connected Burbank Avenue in Suffield with Main Street in Thompsonville. Its four stone piers still stand today.

History 

In 1889 the Suffield and Thompsonville Bridge Company was granted a charter to construct an iron bridge across the Connecticut River between Thompsonville and Suffield. The Berlin Iron Bridge Company of Berlin, Connecticut, was the contractor for the ironwork, and O.W. Weand of Reading, Pennsylvania, was the contractor for the stonework. The first toll-taker was Nathan Hemenway. Tolls were initially three cents for pedestrians, twelve cents for single teams and fifteen cents for double teams.

The Enfield–Suffield Veterans Bridge opened downstream in 1966, and the Suffield and Thompsonville Bridge closed shortly thereafter. The ironwork was removed, but the four piers remain in the river.

See also
 List of crossings of the Connecticut River

References

External links
 
 Enfield Historical Society

Suffield, Connecticut
Enfield, Connecticut
Truss bridges in the United States
Demolished bridges in the United States
Bridges over the Connecticut River
Bridges completed in 1808
Bridges completed in 1893
Bridges in Hartford County, Connecticut
Road bridges in Connecticut
Former toll bridges in Connecticut